Ronen is a Hebrew surname and given name. Its meaning is cheerful and singing.

Notable persons with surname Ronen
 Carol Ronen, American politician
 Eldad Ronen (born 1976), Israeli Olympic competitive sailor
 Eliezer Ronen, Israeli politician
 Moshe Ronen, Canadian lawyer and Jewish community leader
 Nehama Ronen, Israeli politician
 Omry Ronen, Israeli–American philologist

Other uses
Ronen's golden rule for cluster radioactivity formulated by Yigal Ronen, a Professor Emeritus of Nuclear Engineering

References

Hebrew-language surnames
Jewish surnames